The Global Award for Sustainable Architecture was founded in 2006 by architect and scholar Jana Revedin. The Global Award Community, which in 2022 consists of the 75 contemporary architects or architect collectives from around the globe who have previously received the award, works towards a sustainable architectural ethics and fosters research, experimentation, and transmission in the fields of sustainable architecture, urban renewal, and academic social responsibility. It defines architecture as an agent of community empowerment, development and civic rights.

Each year, the award honours five architects who share a common belief in more sustainable development and who have pioneered innovative and holistic approaches in their own communities, in western and emerging countries, in developed cities and precarious districts, in megalopolises, and in the countryside. The Scientific Committee of the Award counts on scholars from the Mimar Sinan University Istanbul, the International Architecture Biennale Ljubljana and the Università Iuav Venice. The Award is run by the Cité de l'Architecture et du Patrimoine. Since 2010, the Global Award for Sustainable Architecture is put under the high Patronage of UNESCO.

The laureates of the Global Award for Sustainable Architecture are selected by the Global Award Scientific Committee. The 2022 committee includes Jana Revedin, Marie-Hélène Contal, Deniz Inceday, Chris Younés, Spela Hudnik Jacopo Galli and as honorary members two former Global Award laureates, Takaharu Tezuka and Francis Kéré.

Each year, the winners' projects, ideas, and practices are gathered in a book: Sustainable Design, Vers une nouvelle éthique pour l'architecture et la ville / Towards a new ethics for architecture and the city, directed and co-written by Marie-Hélène Contal and Jana Revedin, and coedited by Gallimard Editions Alternatives and the Cité de l'Architecture et du patrimoine. The book number 9 is dedicated to the 2021 Global Awards.

2022 
The 2022 edition rises the question: "The Territory: Threat or Opportunity?"
 Anupama Kundoo, Auroville, Berlin 
 Dorte Mandrup, Copenhague 
 Martin Rauch, Schlins, Vorarlberg 
 Okan Bal & Ömer Selçuk Baz, Yalin Architectural Design, Istanbul 
 Gilles Clément, Crozant

2021 
The 2021 edition rises the question: "Architecture and Nature: a new Synergie?"
 Teresa Moller, Santiago
 Solano Benitez & Gloria Cabral, Asuncion
 Severiano Porto, Manaus
 José Cubilla, Asuncion
 Richard Sennett, London

2019 
The 2019 edition celebrates the Centenary of Walter Gropius’ Bauhaus by honoring "the multidisciplinary and social-reformatory aim of the Bauhaus" that is: "Architecture is science, art and crafts at the service of society." 
, Estudio de Arquitectura – Mexico City, Mexico
Werner Sobek, Director of the Institut of Lightweight Structures and Conceptual Design (ILEK) – Stuttgart, Germany
, EPA architects – Istanbul, Turkey
, Khammash Architects – Amman, Jordan
Jorge Lobos, Founder of Emergency Architecture & Human Rights (EAHR) – Copenhagen, Denmark / Arquitecto Jorge Lobos – Puerto Montt, Chile

2018 
The 2018 edition's theme is "Architecture as an agent of civic empowerment". 
 Boonserm Premthada, Bangkok Projects Studio – Bangkok, Thailand
 Nina Maritz, Nina Maritz architects – Klein Windhoek, Namibia
 Marta Maccaglia, Asociación Semillas – Pangoa, Peru
 Anne Lacaton & Jean-Philippe Vassal and  – Paris, France
 Raumlabor – Berlin, Germany

2017 
The 2017 edition is dedicated to the "invisible resources": "an architecture of resources which includes the immaterial and invisible agents of time, rights, community, processes, flows, interdisciplinary dialogue, resilience, senses and experimentation." 
MacKay-Lyons Sweetapple Architects Limited – Halifax, Nova Scotia, Canada
Sonam Wangchuk – Leh, Ladakh, India
Assemble – London, Great Britain
Takaharu and Yui Tezuka, Tezuka Architects – Tokyo, Japan
Paulo David – Madeira, Funchal, Portugal

2016 
The 2016 edition - Jury held during the terrorist attacks to Paris' Bataclan - is dedicated to "Liberty of Thought"
Patrice Doat – Grenoble, France
 Kengo Kuma – Tokyo, Japan
 CASE Studio, Patama Roonrakwit – Bangkok, Thailand
 Gion A. Caminada – Vrin, Switzerland
 East Coast Architects – Durban, South Africa

2015 
 Talca School of Architecture – Talca, Chile
 Santiago Cirugeda – Recetas Urbanas, Sevilla, Spain
 Jan Gehl – Copenhagen, Denmark
 Rotor – Brussels, Belgium
 Marco Casagrande – Helsinki, Finland / Taiwan

2014 
 Christopher Alexander – Arundel, Great Britain / Berkeley, California, USA
 Tatiana Bilbao – Mexico City, Mexico
 Bernd Gundermann, Urbia Group – Auckland, New Zealand
 Martin Rajniš – Prague, Czech Republic
 West 8 – Rotterdam, The Netherlands

2013 
 José Paulo dos Santos – Porto, Portugal
 Kevin Low, Smallprojects – Kuala Lumpur, Malaysia
 Al borde Arquitectos, David Barragán, Pascual Gangotena, Marialuisa Borja, Esteban Benavides – Quito, Ecuador
 Lake/Flato Architects, David Lake and Ted Flato – San Antonio, Texas, USA
 MDW Architecture, Marie Moignot, Xavier De Wil and Gilles Debrun – Brussels, Belgium

2012 
 Salma Samar Damluji – London, UK
 Anne Feenstra – Kabul, Afghanistan
 Suriya Umpansiriratana – Bangkok, Thailand 
 Philippe Madec – Paris, France 
 TYIN tegnestue Architects – Trondheim, Norway

2011 
 Shlomo Aronson – Jerusalem
 Vatnavinir – Reykjavik, Iceland
 Anna Heringer – Laufen, Germany
 Teddy Cruz – Tijuana, Mexico / San Diego, California, USA
 Carmen Arrospide Poblete, Patronato de Cultura Machupicchu – Cuzco, Peru

2010 
 Troppo Architects – Darwin, Australia
 Jun'ya Ishigami – Tokyo, Japan
 Giancarlo Mazzanti – Bogota, Colombia
Kjetil Thorsen Trædal, Snøhetta – Oslo, Norway
 Steve Baer – Albuquerque, New Mexico, USA

2009 
 Patrick Bouchain and Loïc Julienne – France
 Thomas Herzog – Munich, Germany
 Bijoy Jain, Studio Mumbai – Mumbai, India
 Diébédo Francis Kéré – Berlin, Germany / Gando, Burkina Faso
 Sami Rintala – Bodo, Norway

2008 
 Andrew Freear, Rural Studio – Auburn, Alabama, USA
 Fabrizio Carola – Naples, Italy / Bamako, Mali
 Alejandro Aravena, Elemental – Santiago de Chile, Chile
 Carin Smuts, CS Studio Architects – Cape Town, South Africa
 Philippe Samyn, Philippe Samyn & Partners – Brussels, Belgium

2007 
 Hermann Kaufmann – Schwarzach, Vorarlberg, Austria
 Balkrishna Doshi, Vastu-Shilpa Foundation – Ahmedabad, India
 Françoise-Hélène Jourda – Paris, France
 Wang Shu and Lu Wenyu – Hangzhou, China
, Behnisch Architekten – Stuttgart, Germany

References

External links

Cité de l'Architecture et du Patrimoine
Global Award for Sustainable Architecture
Global Award for Sustainable Architecture: Community (Facebook page)

Architecture awards